Bonadias de Nigronibus (died 1487) was a Roman Catholic prelate who served as Bishop of Isola (1479–1487).

Biography
On 4 Jun 1479, Bonadias de Nigronibus was appointed by Pope Sixtus IV as Bishop of Isola. He served as Bishop of Isola until his death in 1487. While bishop, he served as the principal co-consecrator of Michael Hildebrand, Archbishop of Riga (1484).

References

External links and additional sources
 (for Chronology of Bishops) 
 (for Chronology of Bishops)  

1487 deaths
15th-century Roman Catholic bishops in the Kingdom of Naples
Bishops appointed by Pope Sixtus IV